The 2014 United States House of Representatives elections in Colorado were held on Tuesday, November 4, 2014, to elect the seven U.S. representatives from the state of Colorado, one from each of the state's seven congressional districts. The elections will coincide with the elections of other federal and state offices, including Governor of Colorado and U.S. Senator.

Overview

By district
Results of the 2014 United States House of Representatives elections in Colorado by district:

District 1

The 1st district is located in Central Colorado and includes most of the city of Denver. The incumbent is Democrat Diana DeGette, who has represented the district since 1997. She was re-elected with 68% of the vote in 2012 and the district has a PVI of D+18.

Kathleen Cunningham and investment consultant Martin Walsh are running for the Republican nomination.

Primary results

General election

District 2

The 2nd district is located in North Central Colorado and includes Larimer, Grand, Boulder, Gilpin, Summit, Eagle, Clear Creek and Jefferson counties. The incumbent is Democrat Jared Polis, who has represented the district since 2009. He was re-elected with 56% of the vote in 2012 and the district has a PVI of D+8.

The Republican nominee is George Leing, an attorney and former chairman of the Boulder County Republican Party.

Primary results

General election

District 3

The 3rd district is located in Western and Southern Colorado and includes a large number of sparsely populated counties and the city of Grand Junction. The incumbent is Republican Scott Tipton, who has represented the district since 2011. He was re-elected with 53% of the vote in 2012 and the district has a PVI of R+5.

Activist David Cox ran against Tipton in the Republican primary.

Democratic Pueblo County Commissioner and former state representative Buffie McFadyen had been running against Tipton, but withdrew from the race in March 2014. Former Colorado Lottery Director, former state senator and former state representative Abel Tapia jumped in after his withdrawal. Democrats Abel Gebre Lake and Stephen Sheldon had been running but also withdrew from the race. Lieutenant Governor Joseph Garcia and State Senator Gail Schwartz were also speculated to run for the Democratic nomination to challenge Tipton, but declined to do so.

Primary results

General election

District 4

The 4th district is located in Eastern Colorado and includes numerous sparsely populated counties. The incumbent was Republican Cory Gardner, who represented the district since 2011. He was re-elected with 58% of the vote in 2012. The district has a PVI of R+11.

Gardner did not run for re-election. He instead ran for and won the U.S. Senate seat.

Republican primary

Candidates

Declared
 Ken Buck, Weld County District Attorney and nominee for the U.S. Senate in 2010
 Barbara Kirkmeyer, Weld County Commissioner
 Steve Laffey, former mayor of Cranston, Rhode Island and candidate for the U.S. Senate from Rhode Island in 2006
 Scott Renfroe, state senator

Declined
 Sean Conway, Weld County Commissioner
 Tim Dore, state representative
 Cory Gardner, incumbent U.S. Representative (running for the U.S. Senate)
 Frank McNulty, state representative
 Clarice Navarro, state representative
 B.J. Nikkel, former state representative
 Jerry Sonnenberg, state representative (running for the state senate)

Results

Democratic primary

Candidates
 Vic Meyers, case manager in the Colorado Department of Corrections and nominee for the state house in 2000

Withdrew
 Dan Chapin

Results

General election

District 5

The 5th district is located in Central Colorado and includes Fremont, El Paso, Teller and Chaffee counties and the city of Colorado Springs. The incumbent is Republican Doug Lamborn, who has represented the district since 2007. He was re-elected with 65% of the vote in 2012 and the district has a PVI of R+13.

Former Air Force Major General and candidate for the seat in 2006 and 2008 Bentley Rayburn is challenging Lamborn in the Republican primary.

Irv Halter, also a retired Air Force major general, is the Democratic nominee.

Primary results

General election

District 6

The 6th district is located in Central Colorado and surrounds the city of Denver from the east, including the city of Aurora. The incumbent is Republican Mike Coffman, who has represented the district since 2009. He was re-elected with 48% of the vote in 2012 and the district has a PVI of D+1.

Andrew Romanoff, the former Speaker of the Colorado House of Representatives, is the Democratic nominee to challenge Coffman. Former state representative Karen Middleton and State Senator Linda Newell had considered running for the Democratic nomination, but declined to do so.

Primary results

General election

Polling

Results

District 7

The 7th district is located in Central Colorado, to the north and west of Denver and includes the cities of Thornton and Westminster and most of Lakewood. The incumbent is Democrat Ed Perlmutter, who has represented the district since 2007. He was re-elected with 54% of the vote in 2012 and the district has a PVI of D+5.

The Republican nominee is Don Ytterberg, former vice chairman of the Colorado Republican Party. Douglas "Dayhorse" Campbell, a perennial candidate for office and Tyler Bagley ran for the American Constitution Party and the Libertarian Party, respectively, but neither made the ballot.

Primary results

General election

See also
 2014 United States House of Representatives elections
 2014 United States elections

References

External links
U.S. House elections in Colorado, 2014 at Ballotpedia
Campaign contributions at OpenSecrets

Colorado
2014
United States House of Representatives